Northern Altai or Northern Altay is the several tribal Turkic dialects spoken in the Altai Republic of Russia. Though traditionally considered one language, Southern Altai and the Northern varieties are not fully mutually intelligible. Written Altai is based on Southern Altai, and is rejected by Northern Altai children.

Northern Altai is written in Cyrillic. In 2006, in the Altay kray, an alphabet was created for the Kumandin variety.

Demographics
According to data from the 2002 Russian Census, 65,534 people in Russia stated that they have command of the Altay language. Only around 10% of them speak Northern Altay varieties, while the remaining speak Southern Altay varieties. Furthermore, according to some data, only 2% of Altays fluently speak the Altay language.

Varieties
Northern Altay consists of the following varieties:
 (also Qubandy/Quwandy). 1,862 Kumandins claim to know their national language, but 1,044 people were registered as knowing Kumandy. Kumandy has the following three sub-varieties:
Turačak
Solton
Starobardinian
 (also Kuu/Quu, Chalkandu/Shalkanduu, Lebedin). 466 Chelkans claim to speak their national language, and 539 people in all claim to know Chelkan.

The  (also known as Tuba language), is also often ascribed to belong to the Northern Altai group, but its relation to other languages is dubious and it may belong to Kipchak languages. 408 Tubalars claim to know their national language, and 436 people in all reported knowing Tuba.

Linguistic features
The following features refer to the outcome of commonly used Turkic isoglosses in Northern Altay.
 */ag/ — Proto-Turkic */ag/ is found in three variations throughout Northern Altay: /u/, /aw/, /aʁ/
 */eb/ — Proto-Turkic */eb/ is found as either /yj/ or /yg/, depending on the variety
 */VdV/ — With a few lexical exceptions (likely borrowings), proto-Turkic intervocalic */d/ results in /j/.

References

External links 
  Page about the Kumandy variety with maps and grammatical information.
  Page about the Chelkan variety with maps and grammatical information.
  Page about the Tubalar variety with maps and grammatical information.

Agglutinative languages
Turkic languages
Languages of Russia